The Javari Temple in Khajuraho, India, is a Hindu temple, which forms part of the Khajuraho Group of Monuments, a UNESCO World Heritage Site. It was built between c. 975 and 1100 A.D.

The temple is dedicated to the Hindu deity Shiva. The main idol of the temple is broken and headless(see image).

Location
The temple is located in the eastern area of Khajuraho. It is near to and visible from Vamana Temple, and at a distance of about 200 meters (south) from it.

Architecture
It has well-proportioned architecture, with a sanctum, vestibule, mandapa and portico, but without pradakshinapatha. It has remable Makara Torana (Capricorn Arch) and  shikhara (top). It has three bands of carved sculptures on the outer wall. The temple has a close resemblance with Chaturbhuja Temple, also at Khajuraho.

Main idol
The main idol (of Vishnu) of the temple is broken and headless.

Makara (Capricorn) Arch 
Temple has beautiful Makara (Capricorn) Arch at the entrance porch (also seen in image).

Entrance of sanctum
The entrance gate of sanctum has sculptures depicting nava-graha on the top. Along with nava-graha sculptures, sculpture of the Hindu deities Brahma, Vishnu and Shiva can also be seen.

Sculptures
The temple has two bands of sculpture on the outer wall (see image).

Gallery

References

External links 
 M.P. Tourism Website, Official Website of Madhya Pradesh State Tourism Corporation, Khajuraho
 Archaeological Survey of India, Bhopal Division, Index Page for Khajuraho - Chhatarpur 
 Archaeological Survey of India, Bhopal Division, Javari Temple, Khajuraho

Bundelkhand
Monuments and memorials in Madhya Pradesh
World Heritage Sites in Madhya Pradesh
Hindu temples in Khajuraho
Vishnu temples